Asociación Deportiva El Tránsito, commonly known just as ADET, is a professional soccer club located in La Libertad.

ADET ownership had reportedly experienced thousands dollars in operating losses since 2000, according to players and the team presidents the club had gone two years without corporate sponsorships and the municipality of Libertad withdrew its support. In the final game of the season against FAS they played in front 146 supporters and lost almost 13,000 dollars. For the Clausura 2002, the club decided to sell its spot in the Salvadoran Premier Division to newly formed club San Salvador F.C.

Honours
ADET's first trophy was the Liga Ascensio, which they won  in 1983. They won 3  Segunda División title in 1983, 1987-88 and 1990-91.

ADET's honours include the following:

Domestic honours

Leagues
Primera División de Fútbol de El Salvador
 Runners up (1): Clausura 2000
 Segunda División Salvadorean and predecessors 
 Champions: (3): 1983, 1987–88, 1990-1991

Cups
 Copa Champions Tourney: and predecessors 
 Champions (1): 1981

Stadium
 Estadio Hanz Usko, San Salvador, El Salvador (TBD–Present)
 Estadio C. Sello de Oro; San Salvador (TBD) International games prior to the building of Estadio Cuscatlán

ADET plays its home games at Estadio Hanz Usko located in San Salvador. The stadium has a capacity of 3,000 people

Notable players

Domestic and foreign players
Players with senior international caps:

 Santos Rivera
 Mauricio Quintanilla
 Erick Dowson Prado
 Francisco "Chico" Contreras
 Miguel Montes
 Juan Carlos Panameño
 Ronald Cerritos
  Edward Cocherari
 Jorge Armando «Tin» Martinez
 Karl Roland
 Julio César Arzú

Team captains

Head coaches
 Raúl Corcio Zavaleta

 Héctor Palomo Sol (1986-88)
 Jorge Alberto Cruz (1990–1991)
 Pedro Tobías (1996)
 Armando Contreras Palma (1996-1997)
 Victor Manuel Pacheco
 Juan Quarterone (1999–2001)

Records

Club records
 First Match (prior to creation of a league): vs. TBD (a club from TBD), Year
 First Match (official): vs. TBD, year
 Most points in La Primera: 00 points (00 win, 00 draws, 0 losses) Year/Year
 Least points in La Primera: 00 points (0 win, 0 draws, 00 losses) Year/year

Individual records
 Most capped player for El Salvador: 73 (28 whilst at ADET-Baygon), Ronald Cerritos
 Most international caps for El Salvador while a ADET-Baygon player: 28 (73 caps overall), Ronald Cerritos
 Most goals in a season, all competitions: unknown player, O (Year/year) (00 in League, 00 in Cup competitions)
 Most goals in a season, La Primera: TBD, 7

References

Defunct football clubs in El Salvador
Association football clubs established in 1974
Association football clubs disestablished in 2001
1974 establishments in El Salvador
2001 disestablishments in El Salvador